Fatjon Andoni (born 19 June 1991) is an Albanian professional footballer who plays as a defensive midfielder for Greek Super League 2 club Apollon Smyrnis.

References

1991 births
Living people
Footballers from Athens
Greek footballers
Greek people of Albanian descent
Association football midfielders
Albanian footballers
Super League Greece players
Ethnikos Asteras F.C. players
Panachaiki F.C. players
PAS Lamia 1964 players
Apollon Smyrnis F.C. players
Athlitiki Enosi Larissa F.C. players